KIKX (104.7 FM, "104.7 BOB FM") is a commercial radio station located in Ketchum, Idaho, broadcasting to the Twin Falls, Idaho area.  KIKX airs an adult hits music format. On September 7, 2009, KIKX evolved from classic rock to adult hits as "104.7 BOB FM".

External links
Official Website
Locally Owned Radio on Twitter

IKX
Radio stations established in 1996
1996 establishments in Idaho
Bob FM stations
Adult hits radio stations in the United States